Maoridaphne kaiparica is an extinct species of sea snail, a marine gastropod mollusk in the family Raphitomidae.

Description

Distribution
Fossils of this species were found in New Zealand

References

 C. R. Laws. 1939. The molluscan faunule at Pakaurangi Point, Kaipara - No. 1. Transactions and Proceedings of the royal Society of New Zealand 68(4):466-503
 Maxwell, P.A. (2009). Cenozoic Mollusca. pp 232–254 in Gordon, D.P. (ed.) New Zealand inventory of biodiversity. Volume one. Kingdom Animalia: Radiata, Lophotrochozoa, Deuterostomia. Canterbury University Press, Christchurch.

kaiparica
Gastropods described in 1939
Gastropods of New Zealand